SS Guglielmo Marconi was an Italian ocean liner launched on 24 September 1961 for Lloyd Triestino's Genoa—Sydney service. Guglielmo Marconi left Genoa on her maiden voyage on November 18th 1963. In 1976, Guglielmo Marconi was transferred to the Naples-Brazil-River Plate service of Italian Line.

In 1979 she was transferred to Italia Crociere as a full-time cruise ship. This was not a success and she was sold to Costa Lines in 1983. After a two-year rebuild, the ship reappeared as Costa Riviera for Costa Cruises in 1985. Costa Riviera alternated between Caribbean and Alaskan cruising during her time with Costa Cruises.

In 1993, American Family Cruises was launched, a joint venture between Costa and Bruce Nierenburg, to operate cruises aimed at young American families with children. AFC were not successful, and the ship sailed for Genoa in September 1994 where she was converted back to the Costa Riviera, and began cruising her last years in Europe until Costa  Riviera was sold for scrap under the name Liberty in 2001.

References

Ships of Costa Cruises
Ocean liners
Passenger ships of Italy
Ships built in Monfalcone
1961 ships
Ships built by Cantieri Riuniti dell'Adriatico
Guglielmo Marconi